WSTB (88.9 FM) is a non-commercial educational radio station licensed to Streetsboro, Ohio, carrying an alternative rock format known as "88.9 The AlterNation". Owned by the Streetsboro City School District, the station serves the Akron metro area. WSTB's studios are located at Streetsboro High School in Streetsboro, while the station transmitter is in nearby Kent on the campus of Kent State University. In addition to a standard analog transmission, WSTB is available online.

History
WSTB first began broadcasting in March 1972 at 91.5 FM. On July 11, 1995, the station began broadcasting at 88.9 FM.

Current programming
WSTB airs alternative rock music throughout most of the week.  The sole exception is Sunday, when the station airs a day-long block of oldies music; the station itself is effectively re-branded "The Sunday Oldies Jukebox".

References

External links

The Sunday Oldies Jukebox

STB
Modern rock radio stations in the United States
Radio stations established in 1972
1972 establishments in Ohio